The 1951 Texas Tech Red Raiders football team represented Texas Technological College—now known as Texas Tech University—as a member of the Border Conference during the 1951 college football season. Led by first-year head coach DeWitt Weaver, the Red Raiders compiled an overall record of 7–4 with a mark of 4–0 in conference play, winning the Border Conference title. Texas Tech was invited to the Sun Bowl, where they beat the Pacific Tigers.

Schedule

References

Texas Tech
Texas Tech Red Raiders football seasons
Border Conference football champion seasons
Sun Bowl champion seasons
Texas Tech Red Raiders football